The Leeds Tithing Office is a historic building in Leeds, Utah. It was built in 1891-1892 as a tithing building for members of the Church of Jesus Christ of Latter-day Saints, and designed in the Greek Revival style. It remained the property of the church until 1968. It has been listed on the National Register of Historic Places since January 25, 1985.

References

Buildings and structures completed in 1891
Greek Revival architecture in Utah
National Register of Historic Places in Washington County, Utah
Tithing buildings of the Church of Jesus Christ of Latter-day Saints
1891 establishments in Utah Territory